The National Basketball League (NBL) is the premier basketball league for clubs in Tanzania. The league consist out of twelve teams. As of 2021, the defending champions are the Kurasini Heat.

The champions of the NBL are eligible to play in the qualifying rounds of the Basketball Africa League (BAL).

Current teams 
The following were the twelve teams for the 2020 season:
ABC
Chang'ombe Boys
Chui
JKT
Oilers Club
Pazi
PT Stars
Savio Basketball Club
Tanzania Prisons
Don Bosco Panthers
Vijana City Bulls
Kurasini Heat

Champions

Supercup winners

References

Basketball in Tanzania
Basketball leagues in Africa
Sports leagues in Tanzania